Rusha may refer to;

 RuSHA, The Rasse- und Siedlungshauptamt-SS, a Nazi organization
 RuSHA Trial, the eighth of the twelve war crimes trials the US authorities held in Germany following the Second World War, the above organization being part of the trials
 Lea Rusha, one of several people convicted for his part in the 2007 Securitas depot robbery
 A Hebrew derogatory word (רָשָׁע) which literally means a deliberate sinner, commonly used to describe a cruel person